Gogoșari is a commune located in Giurgiu County, Muntenia, Romania. It is composed of four villages: Drăghiceanu, Gogoșari, Izvoru and Rălești.

References

Communes in Giurgiu County
Localities in Muntenia